Headhunting The Homeless  is a British documentary series for the BBC by John Walsh of Walsh Bros Ltd. This three part series followed five homeless people for over a year as they looked for employment on a new scheme involving two hundred companies, including Marks & Spencer, Pret a Manger and Wates Construction, following the work of Eva Hamilton MBE’s  Business Action on Homelessness project  as part of Business in the Community. The goal of this project was to try and break the cycle of homelessness for good, to challenge perceptions of homelessness, and to change the attitudes that business people have and in the process observe the demanding transition into the working world for homeless people. The series followed The Prince of Wales’ Seeing is Believing Programme and then pioneering a new multimillion pound Corporate Social Responsibility project, addressing attempting a new approach on CSR in relation to homelessness.

For Carol Thatcher it’s her first job in 20 years: “I proved to myself that I can do it…I had tears of joy running down my face.” Carol hopes that this new start will help her to reconnect with her children who were taken into care 12 years ago. Accountant David Haighbrown doesn’t fit the stereotype; he’s well-spoken, college educated and motivated. Yet he found himself living rough, forced to rummage through dustbins for food and sleep in shop doorways. “I remember thinking, ‘What have I done to deserve this?’ I’ve never abused drugs or alcohol nor have any criminal record, yet here I am.”

Describing his own film, Walsh has said: "These moving stories of human frailty and redemption, gave for the first time, a dignified voice to people who are not often heard and seldom depicted as real human beings."

Episodes

Awards
Grierson Awards nominated for Best Documentary Series or Strand.

Reception
The series was part of the BBC’s 120 most treasured programmes of the first half of 2003 in the corporation’s drive to convince its critics that the licence fee should not be abolished.

The Guardian described the series as "truly touching". and also chose it as their Pick of the Day.

One episode achieved a rating of 1.4 million according to The Stage.

External links

References

Films directed by John Walsh
British documentary films
2003 films
BBC television documentaries
Films about homelessness
Homelessness in the United Kingdom
Documentary films about homelessness
Documentary films about poverty
2000s British films